Jonesboro is an unincorporated community in Coryell and Hamilton counties in Central Texas. The Coryell County portion of the community is part of the Killeen–Temple–Fort Hood Metropolitan Statistical Area.

The United States Postal Service operates the Jonesboro Post Office.

History
William L. and David Jones built a steam-powered sawmill and gristmill on the Leon River in 1866. It was first settled sometime after the American Civil War and became known as Jones Mill. The local church and Masonic organization shared a large frame building that was built from 1869 to 1873. Its post office was established in 1871 with Charles Pate as postmaster. The community's name was changed to Jonesboro in 1877 and had 350 residents that were served by two steam-powered gristmills and cotton gins, a sawmill, and three churches in the mid-1880s. The population boomed to 700 by the next decade. It declined when the Stephenville North and South Texas Railway bypassed the community in 1911, in which it went down to 450 in 1914. Despite its economy improving in the 1930s, it went into another decline when Texas State Highway 36 was built. The population was 378 from the 1930s to the mid-1960s and continued to fall to 200 from the mid-1970s through 2000.

An article reporting the murder of Sandeela Kanwal mistook the place of the murder for Jonesboro.

Geography

Climate
The climate in this area is characterized by hot, humid summers and generally mild to cool winters. According to the Köppen Climate Classification system, Jonesboro has a humid subtropical climate, abbreviated "Cfa" on climate maps.

Education
Jonesboro had its own school in the mid-1880s and was held in the building where the church and Masonic organization met. The community is served by the Jonesboro Independent School District, which includes Jonesboro School.

Notable person
 Cloyce Box, who played football at Jonesboro School with his brother, Boyce.

References

Unincorporated communities in Coryell County, Texas
Unincorporated communities in Hamilton County, Texas
Unincorporated communities in Texas
Killeen–Temple–Fort Hood metropolitan area